The 1976 Independence Bowl was a post-season college football bowl game between the Tulsa Golden Hurricane and the McNeese State Cowboys on December 13, 1976, at State Fair Stadium in Shreveport, Louisiana. McNeese State upset a heavily favored Tulsa 20–16. This was the first-ever edition of the Independence Bowl, which drew its name from the ongoing celebrations of the United States Bicentennial.

Background 
Between 1976–1980 the Independence Bowl featured the Southland Conference champion against an at-large opponent, with the Southland team playing host. McNeese State clinched the championship and spot in the bowl game after defeating  20–19 on November 20. For the at-large opponent the bowl organizers initially pursued Rutgers, which was then 10–0 and would finish the season undefeated. Rutgers declined the invitation, feeling snubbed by more prestigious bowls. Rebuffed, the organizers considered Tulsa, Cincinnati, Memphis State, Boston College, and Ball State before selecting Tulsa, co-champion of the Missouri Valley Conference.

Prior to the game, coverage favored Tulsa over McNeese State due in large part to sixteen of McNeese State's players being unable to play in the bowl. Ten players were declared ineligible because they had redshirted in their freshman year and were thus fifth-year seniors. At the time, NCAA rules prohibited such players from participating in postseason play. Six more players were suspended from the team for violating team and school rules. The players were accused of having a girl in their dormitory room, which McNeese State then prohibited. Some newspaper accounts alleged that "sexual molestation" had occurred. Even before the game was played F. A. Dry, Tulsa's head coach, had accepted the head coaching job at TCU, though he stayed on at Tulsa for the bowl game.

Scoring summary

References

External links 
 

Independence Bowl, 1976
Independence Bowl
McNeese Cowboys football bowl games
Tulsa Golden Hurricane football bowl games
December 1976 sports events in the United States
Independence Bowl